Taylor Arm Provincial Park is a provincial park in British Columbia, Canada, located on the north side of Sproat Lake 23 km northwest of Port Alberni on Vancouver Island. Situated along Highway 4, the 71-hectare park has few services but provides group camping sites, undeveloped beaches, and day-use areas. The group camping site has pit toilets and a hand pump water supply, and is connected to the lake shore via a trail that passes under the highway.

Creeks
Three watercourses run through the park, emptying into Sproat Lake: Friesen Creek, Clutesi Creek, and Bookhout Creek.

References

Alberni Valley
Provincial parks of British Columbia